Guram Rcheulishvili (Georgian: გურამ რჩეულიშვილი; July 4, 1934 in Tbilisi, Georgia  ― August 23, 1960 in Gagra, Georgia) was a Georgian writer.

Biography
Guram Rcheulishvili was born on July 4, 1934 in Tbilisi. In 1957 he graduated from the historical faculty at Tbilisi State University. His first stories, which were printed in the newspaper Tsiskari in 1957, brought him great success. During his life, only some of his works were published. His collected works, Salamura, were published after his death, in 1961. Rcheulishvili’s prose attracted readers by its style, dialogues, and ideas. His works remain popular. Guram Rcheulishvili’s works have been translated into German, Hungarian, Bulgarian, Lithuanian, Czech, and Russian. He died in Gagra on August 23, 1960 at age 26 while saving an unknown Russian girl in a rough sea. He is buried in Tbilisi, at Vake Cemetery.

Bibliography
 Salamura, a collection of short stories (1961)
 Short Stories (1995)
 Iulon Tragedy I, a dramatic novel, December 1958 (1994)
 Shasha’s Revolution or Revolution in Ortachala on Cotton Row
 Book in Six Volumes (2002-2008)
 Slow Tango, short stories (2005)

References

1934 births
1960 deaths
Writers from Tbilisi
Male poets from Georgia (country)
Historical novelists from Georgia (country)
20th-century novelists
20th-century poets from Georgia (country)
20th-century male writers